Bernard Smith may refer to:

Politicians 
 Bernard Smith (d. 1591) (1522–1591), MP for Totnes
 Bernard Smith (New Jersey politician) (1776–1835), U.S. Congressman from New Jersey
 Bernard C. Smith (1923–1993), New York politician

Sportsmen 
 Bernard Smith (footballer) (1908–?), English footballer for Birmingham and Coventry
 Bernie Smith (1927–1985), Australian rules footballer
 Bernie Smith (baseball) (born 1941), retired American baseball player
 Bernie Smith (darts player) (born 1964), New Zealand darts player
 Bernard Babington Smith (1905–1993), English pole vaulter

Others 
 Bernard Smith (abbot) (1812–1892), Irish Benedictine monk
 Bernard Smith (art historian) (1916–2011), Australian art historian
 Bernard Smith (editor) (1907–1999), American editor, critic and film producer
 Bernard Smith (organ builder) (c. 1630 – 1708), English organ builder
 Bernard Smith (sailboat designer) (1910–2010), American high-speed sailboat designer
 Bernard John Smith (1951–2012), English geomorphologist and physical geographer